Měděnec is a municipality and village in Chomutov District in the Ústí nad Labem Region of the Czech Republic. It has about 100 inhabitants.

Administrative parts
Villages and hamlets of Horní Halže, Kamenné, Kotlina and Mýtinka are administrative parts of Měděnec.

References

Villages in Chomutov District
Mountains of the Ore Mountains